Äio is a release from Estonian folk metal band Metsatöll, released worldwide in 2010 on Spinefarm Records.

Reception
In the May 2010 issue of Terrorizer magazine, writer James Hoare spoke with vocalist/piper Lauri "Varulven".  Lauri is quoted as saying "No other countries have such good researchers of traditional culture and folklore than among oppressed peoples."  Hoare also went on to praise the release, giving special note to the choir; the Estonian National Male Choir participated on the track "Ema hääl kutsub".

Track listing

Personnel

Metsatöll
Markus: vocals, guitars, 
Lauri "Varulven": vocals, acoustic guitars, flutes, mouth harp
Kuriraivo: bass, bass mandolin, shrieks, screaming
Atso: drums, percussion, vocals

Additional Musicians
The Estonian National Male Choir is: Mati Valdaru, Jaan Krivel, Lembit Tolga, Arvo Aun, Erkki Targo, Olev Koit, Rene Keldo, Margus Vaht, Meelis Hainsoo, Mait Männik, Peeter Hillep, Olari Viikholm, Andres Alamaa, Rasmus Erismaa, Geir Luht and Aare Kruusimäe
Choir Arranged By Tauno Aints & Conducted By Andrus Siimon

Production
Produced by Metsatöll
Recorded and engineered by Mikko Karmila (drums) and Kristo Kotkas (vocals, guitars, bass, choir)
Mixed by Mikko Karmila
Mastered by Mika Jussila

External links
Recording & Personnel Information on Metsatoll's website, in English Retrieved 7/04/2010
English Translations For Song Titles Retrieved 07/04/2010

2010 albums
Spinefarm Records albums